"Let the Night Roll On" is a song by Australian hard rock band the Angels, released in January 1990 as the lead single from The Angels ninth studio album Beyond Salvation. "Let the Night Roll On" peaked at number 17 on the ARIA Charts.

Track listing
7-inch single (Mushroom K 1044)
 Let the Night Roll On (Doc Neeson, Richard Brewster, Amanda Miller) – 4:03
 Junk City (Neeson, Bob Spencer, Brewster) – 6:23
12-inch single
 Let the Night Roll On (Neeson, Brewster, Miller) – 4:58
 Junk City (Neeson, Spencer, Brewster) – 6:23

Personnel
 Doc Neeson – lead vocals
 Rick Brewster – lead guitar
 Bob Spencer – rhythm guitar, backing vocals
 James Morley – bass guitar, backing vocals
 Brent Eccles – drums
Production
 Terry Manning – producer (tracks: 1–2)

Charts

Weekly charts

Year-end charts

References

The Angels (Australian band) songs
1990 songs
1990 singles
Mushroom Records singles
Songs written by Doc Neeson